Formicivora is a genus of insectivorous birds in the antbird family, Thamnophilidae. These relatively small, long-tailed antbirds are strongly sexually dichromatic. They are found in semi-open habitats in woodland and shrub  in South America. They have several rows of white spots on the wings. Males are usually darker below than they are above, and sometimes have a fringe of white on the side.

The genus Formicivora was introduced by the English naturalist William Swainson in 1824. The type species is the southern white-fringed antwren. The name of the genus Formicivora combines the Latin words formica for "ant" and -vorus "eating" from vorare "to devour".

The Sincorá antwren was first described in 2007. While initially placed in its own genus Stymphalornis, the marsh antwren belongs in Formicivora. In contrast, the black-hooded antwren is not closely related to other Formicivora and may be better placed in its own genus.

There are nine species:
 Narrow-billed antwren, Formicivora iheringi
 Black-hooded antwren, Formicivora erythronotos
 Southern white-fringed antwren, Formicivora grisea
 Northern white-fringed antwren, Formicivora intermedia
 Serra antwren, Formicivora serrana
 Black-bellied antwren, Formicivora melanogaster
 Rusty-backed antwren, Formicivora rufa
 Sincorá antwren, Formicivora grantsaui
 Marsh antwren, Formicivora acutirostris

References

 
Bird genera
Taxonomy articles created by Polbot